The 1998 European Fencing Championships were held in Plovdiv, Bulgaria.

Medal summary

Men's events

Women's events

Medal table

References 
 Results at the European Fencing Confederation

1998
European Fencing Championships
European Fencing Championships
International fencing competitions hosted by Bulgaria